The following Syrian pilots became flying aces by scoring five or more confirmed aerial victories while flying combat against the Israeli Air Force.

See also
MiG-21 aces
List of Israeli flying aces
List of Egyptian flying aces

Notes

References
 Nicole, David. Arab MiG-19 & MiG-21 Units in Combat, Osprey Publishing 2004, 9781841766553.

Arab–Israeli conflict
Arab-Israeli
Syrian
Syrian Air Force
Flying aces
Flying aces
Syrian flying aces